Romeo High School is located in northern Macomb County, Michigan approximately 30 miles north of the city of Detroit. It is a part of Romeo Community Schools.

Demographics
The demographic breakdown of the 1,738 students enrolled in 2016-17 was:
Male - 50.9%
Female - 49.1%
Native American/Alaskan - >0.1%
Asian - 0.8%
Black - 2.5%
Hispanic - 6.9%
White - 88.7%
Multiracial -1.1%

17.0% of the students were eligible for free or reduced-cost lunch. For 2016–17, Romeo was a Title I school.

Athletics
The Romeo Bulldogs compete in the Macomb Area Conference. The school colors are red and white. The following Michigan High School Athletic Association (MHSAA) sports are offered:

Baseball (boys)
Basketball (girls and boys)
Bowling (girls and boys)
Competitive cheer (girls)
Cross country (girls and boys)
State championship boys - 2020
Football (boys)
State championship - 2015
Golf (girls and boys)
Ice hockey (boys)
State championship - 2016
Lacrosse (boys)
Soccer (girls and boys)
Softball (girls)
Swim and dive (girls and boys) 
Track and field (girls and boys)
Volleyball (girls)
State championship - 2014
Wrestling (boys)

Notable alumni

 Nick Blankenburg, American ice hockey player
 John Stoughton Newberry U. S. Congressman
 Kid Rock, multi-instrumentalist, music producer and actor

References

External links 
 

Schools in Macomb County, Michigan
Public high schools in Michigan
1867 establishments in Michigan